is a role-playing video game and sports video game for the Nintendo 3DS developed and published by Level-5. It was released in Japan on December 5, 2013. No confirmation of a worldwide release has been given. There are two versions of the game, Big Bang and Supernova. An Inazuma Eleven Go Galaxy anime based on the game produced by OLM was aired from May 2013 to March 2014. 

In the game's storyline, players take control of Matsukaze Tenma, the captain of "Earth Eleven", soccer team representing the Earth in an intergalactic soccer tournament where failure will mean humanity's end.

Plot
Football Frontier International Vision 2 (FFIV2) is held, and it's time when all youth soccer teams from different countries can finally compete in the tournament. However, Shinsei Inazuma Japan, the representative team of Japan, have only eleven members—and eight of them are new to soccer. Tenma, Tsurugi and Shindou, as the seniors, must reorganize the team in order to win the tournament.

However, Shinsei Inazuma Japan miraculously win all the matches of the Asia preliminaries, and the truth finally unfolds to them—FFIV2 is merely a fake. It is only a preparation for Shinsei Inazuma Japan to enter the Grand Celesta Galaxy, the galactic tournament that will decide Earth's fate.

External links
Official site 

2013 video games
Association football video games
Inazuma Eleven video games
Japan-exclusive video games
Level-5 (company) games
Nintendo 3DS games
Nintendo 3DS eShop games
Nintendo 3DS-only games
Role-playing video games
Video games developed in Japan
Video games with alternative versions
Video games scored by Yasunori Mitsuda